Chiba Jets Funabashi is a Japanese professional basketball team located in Funabashi, Chiba. The team joined the JBL Super League in 2005 and currently competes in the B.League.

The 31,000sqm Lala Arena Tokyo Bay is scheduled to open in spring 2024.

Domestic 
B.League
Champions (1): 2020-21
Runner-up (2): 2017-18,2018-19
Conference Champions (3): 2017-18,2018-19,2021-22
Emperor's Cup
Champions (4): 2017,2018,2019,2023
Runner-up (1): 2022

Continental
East Asia Super League
Champions (1): 2017

Season by season

Roster

Individual awards

Final MVP
Sebas Saiz (2021)
League MVP
Yuki Togashi (2019)
League Best Five
Yuki Togashi (2017,2018,2019,2020,2021,2022)
League Best 6th Man
Christopher Smith (2022)	
Tyler Stone  (2017)
League Assist leader
Yuki Togashi (2020,2022)
League Steal leader
Michael Parker (2018)
League 3point pct leader
Kosuke Ishii (2019)
League Coach of the Year
Atsushi Ōno (2021)

Notable players
To appear in this section a player must have either:
- Set a club record or won an individual award as a professional player.
- Played at least one official international match for his senior national team.

Coaches
Eric Gardow（2011-12）
Shinji Tomiyama（2012-13）
 Reggie Geary（2013-15）
 Željko Pavličević（2015-2016.3）
 Hiroki Sato（acting、2016）
 Atsushi Ono（2016-22）
 John Patrick（2022- ）

Arenas
Funabashi Arena
Chiba Port Arena

Practice facilities
They practice at the 「ROCK ICE BASE」 in Yachiyo.

References

External links

Official site

 
Basketball teams in Japan
Basketball teams established in 2005
2005 establishments in Japan
Sports teams in Chiba Prefecture
Funabashi